Trichophysetis rufoterminalis is a moth in the family Crambidae. It is found in Russia, India, Taiwan and Japan.

References

Cybalomiinae
Moths described in 1881
Moths of Asia